This is a list of newspapers in Alabama, United States. The first title was produced in 1811, and "by 1850, there were 82 newspapers in Alabama, of which nine were dailies."

Daily and nondaily newspapers (currently published)
The following are daily, weekly, semi-weekly, etc., newspapers published in Alabama:

University newspapers
 The Auburn Plainsman – Auburn University 
 The Crimson White – University of Alabama, Tuscaloosa
 The Kaleidoscope – University of Alabama at Birmingham
The Vanguard-The University of South Alabama
The Springhillian - Spring Hill College
The Chanticleer - Jacksonville State University, Jacksonville
 The Crimson – Samford University

Defunct

See also

 Alabama media
 List of radio stations in Alabama
 List of television stations in Alabama
 Media in cities in Alabama: Birmingham, Huntsville, Mobile, Montgomery, Tuscaloosa
 Journalism:
 :Category:Journalists from Alabama
 University of Alabama College of Communication and Information Sciences in Tuscaloosa
 Alabama literature

References

 eCirc FAS-FAX Report 2005-03-31.  Audit Bureau of Circulations.

Bibliography
 
  (+ List of titles 50+ years old)
 
 
 
 
 
 
  (Includes information about weekly rural newspapers in Alabama)
 Rhoda Coleman Ellison. History and Bibliography of Alabama Newspapers in the Nineteenth Century. Tuscaloosa: University of Alabama Press, 1954.
 
 
 
 
  (Includes information about Alabama newspapers)

External links

  
 
  (Directory ceased in 2017)
 
 
 
 
 USNPL.com: Alabama Newspapers. US Newspaper List.

Images

Alabama